The Men's Super-G in the 2021 FIS Alpine Skiing World Cup consisted of six events, although seven had been originally scheduled. 

After midseason injuries to former discipline champions Aleksander Aamodt Kilde of Norway and Mauro Caviezel of Switzerland, Austrian skier Vincent Kriechmayr won the next two races and opened a huge lead in the discipline standings. Going into the finals, only Marco Odermatt of Switzerland retained a slim mathematical chance of surpassing Kriechmayr. The final was scheduled for Thursday, 18 March in Lenzerheide, Switzerland. Only the top 25 of the specific ranking and the winner of the Junior World Championship were eligible, except that athletes who have scored at least 500 points in the overall classification could participate in all specialties. However, a continuation of the heavy snow and bad weather that had forced the cancellation of the downhill final the day before also forced cancellation of the Super-G final, ending Odermatt's chances and giving Kriechmayr the crystal globe.

The season was interrupted by the 2021 World Ski Championships, which were held from 8–21 February in Cortina d'Ampezzo, Italy.  The men's Super-G was scheduled for 9 February but was postponed due to fog and finally took place on 11 February 2021.

Standings

DNF = Did Not Finish
DNS = Did Not Start

See also
 2021 Alpine Skiing World Cup – Men's summary rankings
 2021 Alpine Skiing World Cup – Men's Overall
 2021 Alpine Skiing World Cup – Men's Downhill
 2021 Alpine Skiing World Cup – Men's Giant Slalom
 2021 Alpine Skiing World Cup – Men's Slalom
 2021 Alpine Skiing World Cup – Men's Parallel
 World Cup scoring system

References

External links
 Alpine Skiing at FIS website

Men's Super-G
FIS Alpine Ski World Cup men's Super-G discipline titles